Greenslopes busway station is located in Brisbane, Australia serving the suburb of Greenslopes.

It opened on 30 April 2001 when the South East Busway was extended from Woolloongabba to Eight Mile Plains.

It is served by eight routes operated by Brisbane Transport and Clarks Logan City Bus Service as part of the TransLink network.

The busway is part of a transit corridor, including the M3 motorway and Veloway 1 cycle route, passing through Ekibin Park in Greenslopes.

References

External links
[ Greenslopes station] TransLink

Bus stations in Brisbane
Greenslopes, Queensland
Transport infrastructure completed in 2001